Kei Nishikori was the four-time defending champion, but chose to compete in Buenos Aires instead.

Ryan Harrison won his first ATP World Tour singles title, defeating Nikoloz Basilashvili in the final, 6–1, 6–4. This was the first time in the tournament's 41-year history that no seeded players reached the semifinals. It was also the first ATP tour level event where this happened since 2013 at Nice.

Seeds
The top four seeds receive a bye into the second round.

Draw

Finals

Top half

Bottom half

Qualifying

Seeds

Qualifiers

Lucky loser
  Benjamin Becker

Qualifying draw

First qualifier

Second qualifier

Third qualifier

Fourth qualifier

References

 Main Draw
 Qualifying Draw

2017 ATP World Tour
2017 Men's Singles